Éclaires is a commune in the Marne department in north-eastern France.

On April 14, 2011, Éclaires was the location of the TGV landspeed record attempt, which it broke with a speed of 574.8 km/h.

See also
Communes of the Marne department

References

Communes of Marne (department)